

Computer and information sciences

National Academy of Sciences (Computer and information sciences)
Lists of computer scientists